Alhaji Mumuni Bawumia was a Ghanaian politician, lawyer and the paramount chief of Kperiga in the then Northern region of Ghana. He was chairman of the council of state in the 4th republic from 1993 to 2000.

Career 
Bawumia was a member of the national assembly of Ghana from 1951 to 1966. He served as clerk to the district council of Mamprusi and then to the Mamprusi state council. He was member of the Northern People's Party and later the United Party. He defected away from the United Party whilst still in parliament and cross-carpeted to the Convention People's Party in 1958. After this, he served in a number of ministerial roles in the governments of Kwame Nkrumah. He was minister for works and housing, special development commissioner for development of Accra, deputy minister, northern regional minister and then a local government minister.  
 
He was selected to be chief of Kperiga in present-day West Mamprusi District of the North East Region of Ghana. In 1978, he was made interim chairman of the management committee of the Cocoa Marketing Board. In 1988, the PNDC government appointed him as Ghana's Ambassador to Saudi Arabia. He was elected chairman of the Council of State from 1993 to 2000, thus becoming the first chairman of the council of state in the 4th Ghanaian Republic. His son Mahamudu Bawumia is the Vice-President of Ghana.

Mumuni Bawumia died in September 2002.

Personal life 
He was married to Mariama Bawumia (1939-2021). They had five children together, including Mahamudu Bawumia, although Mumuni Bawumia had offspring by other consorts.

References

People from Northern Region (Ghana)
Ghanaian MPs 1951–1954
Ghanaian MPs 1954–1956
Ghanaian MPs 1956–1965
Ghanaian MPs 1965–1966
Ghanaian writers
Northern People's Party politicians